A list of Bangladesh films 1974

See also

1974 in Bangladesh

References

External links 
 Bangladeshi films on Internet Movie Database

Film
Bangladesh
 1974